Garza Creek, originally El Arroyo de las Garzas (The Creek of the Herons).  Its source on the north slope of Zwang Peak of the Diablo Range, in Kings County.

It flows east-northeast through Kreyenhagen Hills to terminate in the Kettleman Plain, 3.6 miles west northwest of Avenal in the San Joaquin Valley.

History 
Arroyo de las Garzas was a watering place on the route of the El Camino Viejo in the San Joaquin Valley between Arroyo de Las Canoas and Alamo Solo Spring, in what is now Kings County.

This creek was the place first settled by Dave Kettelman, a 49er that went back to the Missouri River, and returned with a herd of cattle, which he pastured on his ranch in the Kettleman Plain and the Kettleman Hills west of Tulare Lake.

His name was later given to Kettleman Station, Kettleman City and the Kettleman North Dome Oil Field.

References

Rivers of Kings County, California
Diablo Range
Geography of the San Joaquin Valley
El Camino Viejo
Rivers of Northern California